Wonder Where We Land is the second studio album from British producer SBTRKT. It was released on 7 October 2014 through Young Turks.

Background

For Wonder Where We Land, SBTRKT aimed to expand the concept of the SBTRKT identity belonging to one person by diverging from the club-inspired and minimal approach of SBTRKT's first album. In order to achieve this, SBTRKT brought in a larger array of singers and musicians and conducted sessions in the USA and the UK, notably Osea, a remote island of the coast of Essex. SBTRKT and SBTRKT's visual collaborator, A Hidden Place chose to visually reflect this expansion of the SBTRKT identity by depicting the concept of SBTRKT as an unknown quadrupedal masked creature on the artwork of this album.

The record is dedicated to SBTRKT's older brother, Daniel, who died from cancer during the album's creation.

Critical reception

Wonder Where We Land received mostly positive reviews from contemporary music critics. At Metacritic, which assigns a normalized rating out of 100 to reviews from mainstream critics, the album received an average score of 71, based on 21 reviews, which indicates "generally favorable reviews".

Track listing

Charts

References

2014 albums
SBTRKT albums
Young Turks (record label) albums